The 1943 NFL season was the 24th regular season of the National Football League.

Due to the exodus of players who had left to serve in World War II, the Cleveland Rams were granted permission to suspend operations for this season, while the Philadelphia Eagles and the Pittsburgh Steelers merged for this one season, with the combined team (known as Phil-Pitt and called the "Steagles" by fans) playing four home games in Philadelphia and two in Pittsburgh. With only 8 teams playing, the 1943 season ties the 1932 season for the fewest teams in the league.

The season ended when the Chicago Bears defeated the Washington Redskins, 41–21, in the NFL Championship Game played the day after Christmas, the first time in NFL history that a playoff game was played so late in the year; Chicago had finished its regular season on November 28 and won the Western Division with an 8–1–1 record, but the Bears had to wait for three weeks while the Eastern Division champion was determined.

Washington and the New York Giants ended the regular season by playing against each other on two consecutive Sundays, December 5 and 12 (the second game, originally scheduled on October 3 had been postponed due to heavy rain). The Giants won both games to force a first-place tie at 6–3–1 each, but the Redskins won the playoff game and earned the right to play the Bears.

Despite the war, the league's popularity continued to grow. The league drew a cumulative 1,072,462 fans, which was fewer than 7,000 short of the record set the previous year despite the fact that 15 fewer games were played. The increased attendance was attributed to the higher competitiveness of the weaker squads.

Draft
The 1943 NFL Draft was held on April 8, 1943 at Chicago's Palmer House Hotel. With the first pick, the Detroit Lions selected runningback Frank Sinkwich from the University of Georgia.

Major rule changes

The free substitution rule is adopted. The rule was enacted in response to the depleted rosters of the World War II period, but it profoundly changed the game. Previously a player could enter the game a single time in each of the first three quarters; in the fourth quarter, two players on each squad could each be substituted twice. Because of these restrictions, players went "both ways", playing both offense and defense. This rule change eventually led to teams having separate offensive and defensive units and various "specialists" (placekickers, punters, returners, etc.). A similar rule had been adopted a few years earlier in college football.
The wearing of helmets becomes mandatory for all players.

Division races
The NFL played a shortened schedule of ten games. In the Eastern Division, the Phil-Pitt team won its first two games and led at Week Four, with 1–0–0 Washington close behind, while in the Western Division, the Bears and Packers tied 21–21 in their first game and were 2–0–1 after four weeks.

In Week Five, the division leaders played each other on October 17, with the Bears beating the Steagles 48–21 and the Redskins defeating the Packers 33–7, leaving the two winners in first place.

The Redskins (5–0–1) and Bears (7–0–1) were still unbeaten going into Week Eleven, and met in Washington on November 21, with the Redskins winning 21–7. The Redskins had their first loss in Week Twelve when they lost to Phil-Pitt, 27–14, on November 28. The Bears clinched the Western Division the same day with a 35–24 win over the Cardinals for an 8–1–1 finish. In Week Thirteen, Phil-Pitt lost its last game, falling to Green Bay 38–28, and was out of contention at 5–4–1. Meanwhile, the Giants beat the Redskins, 14–10, in New York. The next week, the Giants (5–3–1) defeated the Redskins (6–2–1) in Washington, 31–7, creating a tie in the Eastern Division. For the third straight weekend, New York and Washington faced each other, this time in a playoff, which the Redskins won 28–0.

Final standings

Playoffs
See: 1943 NFL playoffs

Home team in capitals
Eastern Division Playoff Game (December 19, 1943)
Washington 28, N.Y. GIANTS 0
NFL Championship Game (December 26, 1943)
Chicago Bears 41, Washington 21

League leaders

Awards

Coaching changes
Brooklyn Dodgers: Mike Getto was replaced by Pete Cawthon.
Chicago Cardinals: Jimmy Conzelman was replaced by Phil Handler.
Detroit Lions: Gus Dorais was hired as new head coach. Bill Edwards was released after three games in 1942, and John Karcis then served for the final eight games.
Steagles: Philadelphia Eagles head coach Greasy Neale and Pittsburgh Steelers head coach Walt Kiesling served as co-head coaches of the Steagles.
Washington Redskins: Ray Flaherty was replaced by Dutch Bergman.

Stadium changes
The merged Steagles split their games between Philadelphia's Shibe Park and Pittsburgh's Forbes Field.

References
 NFL Record and Fact Book
 NFL History 1941–1950 (Last accessed December 4, 2005)
 Total Football: The Official Encyclopedia of the National Football League

1943